Arter is a surname. Notable people with the surname include:

 Harry Arter
 Jared Maurice Arter
 Kingsley Arter Taft
 Philip and Uriah Arter, after whom Philip and Uriah Arter Farm is named
 Robert Arter
 Solomon Arter, after whom Solomon Arter House is named 
 Charlotte Arter

See also
 Eye dialect spelling of "after"
 Arter Island, see Kuş Island
 Arter & Hadden, former Cleveland, Ohio, US law firm
 Arter (art center), an art space in Istanbul